Shevir or Shavir or Shuyer may refer to:
 Shavir, Ardabil (شوير - Shavīr)
 Shevir, Zanjan (شوير - Shevīr)
 Ari Shavit, Israeli reporter and writer